Epicampoptera is a genus of moths in the family Drepanidae. The genus was first described by Felix Bryk in 1913.

They are defoliators of coffee plants (Rubiaceae) and the species are difficult to determine by sight.

Type species: Epicampoptera erosa (Holland, 1893)

Some species of this genus are
 Epicampoptera andersoni (Tams, 1925)
 Epicampoptera carnea (Saalmüller, 1884)
 Epicampoptera difficilis Hering, 1934
 Epicampoptera efulena Watson, 1965
 Epicampoptera erosa (Holland, 1893)
 Epicampoptera graciosa Watson, 1965
 Epicampoptera griveaudi Watson, 1965
 Epicampoptera heringi Gaede, 1927
 Epicampoptera heterogyna (Hampson, 1914)
 Epicampoptera ivoirensis Watson, 1965
 Epicampoptera marantica (Tams, 1930)
 Epicampoptera notialis Watson, 1965
 Epicampoptera pallida (Tams, 1925)
 Epicampoptera robusta Watson, 1965
 Epicampoptera seydeli Watson, 1965
 Epicampoptera strandi Bryk, 1913
 Epicampoptera tamsi Watson, 1965
 Epicampoptera tumidula Watson, 1965

References

Drepaninae
Drepanidae genera